Tenellia odhneri is a species of sea slug, an aeolid nudibranch, a marine gastropod mollusc in the family Fionidae.

Distribution
This species was described from Puerto Montt, Chile. In 2003, the species had not been found subsequent to the original description.

References 

Fionidae
Gastropods described in 1959
Endemic fauna of Chile